Al-Ḥasan ibn ʿAmmār al-Kalbī, usually called simply Ibn Ammar in the Arabic sources, was an Arab commander for the Fatimid Caliphate. A member of the Kalbid family, he was active in the wars with the Byzantine Empire in Sicily in the 960s, leading the capture of Taormina and Rometta, which completed the Muslim conquest of Sicily. 

Some scholars identify him with "Abu Muhammad al-Hasan ibn Ali", also known as Ibn Ammar, a leader of the Kutama Berbers and chief minister (wāsiṭa) during the first year of the reign of the Fatimid Caliph al-Hakim bi-Amr Allah, but this is disputed.

Biography
Hasan was the son of Ammar ibn Ali al-Kalbi, a member of the Kalbid family, which had come into prominence through Ammar's brother al-Hasan ibn Ali al-Kalbi. Along with Ahmad, Ammar fought in the wars with the Byzantine Empire in Sicily and southern Italy, and drowned during an abortive expedition against Otranto in 958.

Following the Byzantine reconquest of Crete in 960–961, the Fatimids once more turned their attention to Sicily, where they decided to reduce the remaining Byzantine outposts in the northeast and complete the Muslim conquest of the island. On Christmas Day 962 Hasan and his cousin Ahmad captured Taormina after a siege of seven and a half months, while on 24 August 963 Hasan laid siege to Rometta. The garrison of the latter sent for aid to Emperor Nikephoros II Phokas. The Emperor prepared a major expedition, allegedly 40,000 strong, which arrived in Italy in late 964. Learning of this, Hasan also sought reinforcements, which arrived under the command of his namesake uncle. The Byzantines attempted to relieve Rometta, and on 25 October 964 clashed with Hasan's army. The Byzantines were victorious in the initial engagement, but Hasan managed to rally his men and won a crushing victory. According to al-Maqrizi and Abu'l-Fida, more than 10,000 Byzantines fell, including the Emperor's nephew, Manuel Phokas, and several other commanders. The surviving Byzantines fled in panic, but were badly mauled again when the Arabs caught up with them in a defile ("battle of the pit"). The remnants of the Byzantine troops boarded their ships, but the Byzantine fleet was destroyed at the Battle of the Straits by Hasan's cousin Ahmad, sealing the fate of Rometta. The city surrendered a few months later, in early 965, after its provisions were exhausted and its inhabitants started fleeing the city.

Disputed identity
Michael Brett and other scholars identify al-Hasan al-Kalbi with another Ibn Ammar, who in 971 led an army of Kutama Berbers to reinforce the Fatimid troops in Egypt, and who after the death of Caliph al-Aziz Billah became briefly regent with the title of wāsiṭa ("intermediary"), and led a staunchly pro-Berber regime that antagonized the other factions of the army, until he was overthrown by Barjawan in October 997. Other scholars consider the later Ibn Ammar to have himself been a Kutama Berber leader, under the name of "Abu Muhammad al-Hasan ibn Ali".

References

Sources
 
 
 
 
 
 
 
 
 

10th-century Arabs
Generals of the Fatimid Caliphate
Kalbids
Fatimid people of the Arab–Byzantine wars
10th-century people from the Fatimid Caliphate